Sameh Mohamed Ashour (born in Sohag) is an Egyptian lawyer who completed his LLB in 1975. He was the Vice President of Supreme Consultancy Council, Egypt Bar association, head of lawyers syndicate, vice president of International Bar association and African Bar Association and president of the Arab Lawyers Association.

References 

Living people
Year of birth missing (living people)
People from Sohag Governorate
20th-century Egyptian lawyers
21st-century Egyptian lawyers